Strážiště is a municipality and village in Mladá Boleslav District in the Central Bohemian Region of the Czech Republic. It has about 100 inhabitants.

Administrative parts
The village of Kozmice is an administrative part of Strážiště.

History
The first written mention of Strážiště is from 1400.

References

Villages in Mladá Boleslav District